Franz Xaver Lederle (born 1931) is a German cinematographer. He shot several entries in the Jerry Cotton series of films for Constantin Film during the 1960s.

Selected filmography
 The Puzzle of the Red Orchid (1962)
 The World Revolves Around You (1964)
 Die Rechnung – eiskalt serviert (1966)
 Murderers Club of Brooklyn (1967)
 When Night Falls on the Reeperbahn (1967)
 Death and Diamonds (1968)
 Succubus (1968)
 Death in the Red Jaguar (1968)
 The Doctor of St. Pauli (1968)
 When Sweet Moonlight Is Sleeping in the Hills (1969)
 That Can't Shake Our Willi! (1970)
 The Priest of St. Pauli (1970)
 Rudi, Behave! (1971)
 Bloody Friday (1972)
 Cry of the Black Wolves (1972)
 Trouble with Trixie (1972)
 Old Barge, Young Love (1973)
 No Gold for a Dead Diver (1974)
 Three Bavarians in Bangkok (1976)
 Vanessa (1977)
 Three Swedes in Upper Bavaria (1977)
 Love Hotel in Tyrol (1978)
 She's 19 and Ready (1979)
 Cola, Candy, Chocolate (1979)
 Starke Zeiten (1988)
 Hochwürden erbt das Paradies (1993, TV film)

References

Bibliography

External links 
 

1931 births
Living people
People from Mindelheim
German cinematographers
Film people from Bavaria